The Great Karas Mountains (Afrikaans: Groot Karasberge) are located in the ǁKaras Region of southern Namibia, the driest part of the country. Mt. Schroffenstein, at 2206 meters is the highest peak in the range. The peak lies about ten kilometers east of the national road B1 between Keetmanshoop and Grünau. 

ǁKhauxaǃnas, an uninhabited village with a ruined fortress dating to the 18th century, is located to the east of the mountains.

References

Mountain ranges of Namibia
Geography of ǁKaras Region